"Für immer" [Forever] is a punk song by Die Ärzte.  It was the ninth track and the first single from their 1986 album Die Ärzte. The song's lyrics express the singer (hinted to be a coroner) longing for a girl he has fallen deeply in love with on first sight, even though she is dead.

Track listing 

 "Für immer" (Urlaub) - 3:44
 "Jenseits von Eden" (Chris Evans-Ironside, Kurt Gebegern, Joachim Horn-Bernges/Chris Evans-Ironside, Kurt Gebegern) - 3:59

Maxi

 "Für immer (No Time - Extended version)" (Urlaub) - 5:47
 "Jenseits von Eden" (Chris Evans-Ironside, Kurt Gebegern, Joachim Horn-Bernges/Chris Evans-Ironside, Kurt Gebegern) - 3:59
 "Ewige Blumenkraft" (Felsenheimer, Urlaub) - 3:20

B-sides
 "Jenseits von Eden" [Beyond Eden], cover of Nino de Angelo-Schlagers is also from "Die Ärzte".
 "Ewige Blumenkraft" [Eternal flower power] is later put on "Das Beste von kurz nach früher bis jetze".

1986 singles
Die Ärzte songs
Songs written by Farin Urlaub
1986 songs
CBS Records singles